Nymph Island is within the Turtle Group national park in Far North Queensland, Australia, 1,636 km northwest of Brisbane. It is circular, with a lagoon in the centre. The island is only about a kilometre in diameter. No point on the island appears to exceed 30 metres (about 100 feet) in elevation.

See also

 Protected areas of Queensland

References 

National parks of Far North Queensland
Islands of Queensland
Protected areas established in 1980
1980 establishments in Australia